Parade of the West is a 1930 American pre-Code
Western film directed by Harry Joe Brown and written by Bennett Cohen and Leslie Mason. The film stars Ken Maynard, Gladys McConnell, Otis Harlan, Jack Hanlon, Frank Rice and Fred Burns. The film was released on January 19, 1930, by Universal Pictures.

Cast 
Ken Maynard as Bud Rand
Gladys McConnell as Mary Owens
Otis Harlan as Professor Clayton
Jack Hanlon as Billy Rand 
Frank Rice as Snuffy
Fred Burns as Copeland
Bobby Dunn as Shorty 
Stanley Blystone as Dude 
Frank Yaconelli as Sicily Joe
Blue Washington as Sambo
Tarzan as Tarzan
Rex the Wonder Horse as Mankiller

References

External links 
 

1930 films
1930s English-language films
American Western (genre) films
1930 Western (genre) films
Universal Pictures films
Films directed by Harry Joe Brown
American black-and-white films
1930s American films